The caduceus (☤; ; , from   "herald's wand, or staff") is the staff carried by Hermes in Greek mythology and consequently by Hermes Trismegistus in Greco-Egyptian mythology. The same staff was also borne by heralds in general, for example by Iris, the messenger of Hera. It is a short staff entwined by two serpents, sometimes surmounted by wings.  In Roman iconography, it was often depicted being carried in the left hand of Mercury, the messenger of the gods.

Some accounts suggest that the oldest known imagery of the caduceus has its roots in Mesopotamia with the Sumerian god Ningishzida; his symbol, a staff with two snakes intertwined around it, dates back to 4000 BC to 3000 BC.

As a symbolic object, it represents Hermes (or the Roman Mercury), and by extension trades, occupations, or undertakings associated with the god. In later Antiquity, the caduceus provided the basis for the astronomical symbol for planet Mercury. Thus, through its use in astrology, alchemy, and astronomy it has come to denote the planet Mercury and by extension the planetary metal that now has the same name. It is said the wand would wake the sleeping and send the awake to sleep. If applied to the dying, their death was gentle; if applied to the dead, they returned to life.

By extension of its association with Mercury and Hermes, the caduceus is also a recognized symbol of commerce and negotiation, two realms in which balanced exchange and reciprocity are recognized as ideals. This association is ancient, and consistent from the Classical period to modern times. The caduceus is also used as a symbol representing printing, again by extension of the attributes of Mercury (in this case associated with writing and eloquence).

Although the Rod of Asclepius, which has only one snake and is never depicted with wings, is the traditional and more widely used symbol of medicine, the Caduceus is sometimes used by healthcare organizations. Given that the caduceus is primarily a symbol of commerce and other non-medical symbology, many healthcare professionals disapprove of this usage.

Classical antiquity

Mythology
The Homeric hymn to Hermes relates how his half brother Apollo got enchanted by Hermes's music from his lyre fashioned from a tortoise shell, which Hermes kindly gave to him. Apollo in return gave Hermes the caduceus as a gesture of friendship. The association with the serpent thus connects Hermes to Apollo, as later the serpent was associated with Asclepius, the "son of Apollo".

The association of Apollo with the serpent is a continuation of the older Indo-European dragon-slayer motif. Wilhelm Heinrich Roscher (1913) pointed out that the serpent as an attribute of both Hermes and Asclepius is a variant of the "pre-historic semi-chthonic serpent hero known at Delphi as Python", who in classical mythology is slain by Apollo.

One Greek myth of origin of the caduceus is part of the story of Tiresias, who found two snakes copulating and killed the female with his staff.  Tiresias was immediately turned into a woman, and so remained until he was able to repeat the act with the male snake seven years later.  This staff later came into the possession of the god Hermes, along with its transformative powers.

Another myth suggests that Hermes (or Mercury) saw two serpents entwined in mortal combat. Separating them with his wand he brought about peace between them, and as a result the wand with two serpents came to be seen as a sign of peace.

In Rome, Livy refers to the caduceator who negotiated peace arrangements under the diplomatic protection of the caduceus he carried.

Iconography
In some vase paintings ancient depictions of the Greek kerukeion are somewhat different from the commonly seen modern representation. These representations feature the two snakes atop the staff (or rod), crossed to create a circle with the heads of the snakes resembling horns. This old graphic form, with an additional crossbar to the staff, seems to have provided the basis for the graphical sign of Mercury (☿) used in  Greek astrology from Late Antiquity.

Origin and comparative mythology

The term kerukeion denoted any herald's staff, not necessarily associated with Hermes in particular.

In his study of the cult of Hermes, Lewis Richard Farnell (1909) assumed that the two snakes had simply developed out of ornaments of the shepherd's crook used by heralds as their staff. This view has been rejected by later authors pointing to parallel iconography in the Ancient Near East. It has been argued that the staff or wand entwined by two snakes was itself representing a god in the pre-anthropomorphic era. Like the herm or priapus, it would thus be a predecessor of the anthropomorphic Hermes of the classical era.

Ancient Near East
 

William Hayes Ward (1910) discovered that symbols similar to the classical caduceus sometimes appeared on Mesopotamian cylinder seals. He suggested the symbol originated some time between 3000 and 4000 BC, and that it might have been the source of the Greek caduceus. A.L. Frothingham incorporated Dr. Ward's research into his own work, published in 1916, in which he suggested that the prototype of Hermes was an "Oriental deity of Babylonian extraction" represented in his earliest form as a snake god. From this perspective, the caduceus was originally representative of Hermes himself, in his early form as the Underworld god Ningishzida, "messenger" of the "Earth Mother".
The caduceus is mentioned in passing by Walter Burkert as "really the image of copulating snakes taken over from Ancient Near Eastern tradition".

In Egyptian iconography, the Djed pillar is depicted as containing a snake in a frieze of the Dendera Temple complex.

India
The caduceus also appears as a symbol of the punch-marked coins of the Maurya Empire in India, in the third or second century BC. Numismatic research suggest that this symbol was the symbol of the Buddhist king Ashoka, his personal "Mudra". This symbol was not used on the pre-Mauryan punch-marked coins, but only on coins of the Maurya period, together with the three arched-hill symbol, the "peacock on the hill", the triskelis and the Taxila mark.
It also appears carved in basalt rock in few temples of western ghats.

Early modern use
During the early modern period, the caduceus was used as a symbol of rhetoric (associated with Mercury's eloquence).

Current use

Symbol of commerce
A simplified variant of the caduceus is to be found in dictionaries, indicating a "commercial term" entirely in keeping with the association of Hermes with commerce. In this form the staff is often depicted with two winglets attached and the snakes are omitted (or reduced to a small ring in the middle). The Customs Service of the former German Democratic Republic employed the caduceus, bringing its implied associations with thresholds, translators, and commerce, in the service medals they issued their staff. The caduceus is also the symbol of the Customs Agency of Bulgaria and of the Financial Administration of the Slovak Republic (Tax and Customs administration). The emblems of Belarus Customs and China Customs are a caduceus crossing with a golden key. The emblem of the Federal Customs Service of Russia has a caduceus crossing with a torch on the shield. The coat of arms of Kyiv National University of Trade and Economics of Ukraine has two crossed torches surmounted by a caduceus on the shield.

Confusion with Rod of Asclepius

Computer coding

Coats of arms and flags
The symbol is depicted on multiple coats of arms and flags.

See also

Notes

Sources

.

References

Further reading

 Bunn, J. T. Origin of the caduceus motif, JAMA, 1967. United States National Institutes of Health: National Center for Biotechnology Information. 
 Burkert, Walter, Structure and History in Greek Mythology and Ritual, Translation, University of California, 1979.

External links

 Iris and Infant Hermes with Caduceus
 Caduceus from Encyclopædia Britannica
 Fenkl, Heinz Insu, 

Mythological objects
Symbols
Pictograms
Heraldic charges
Esoteric schools of thought
Hermes
Snakes in art
Walking sticks
Ritual weapons
Honorary weapons
Snakes in religion